Jutia may refer to:
 Hutia, a cavy-like rodent
 Jutia, Bangladesh
 Latinized name of Jutland (Jutes' land)

la:Iutia